The Department of Manuscripts and Rare Books of the Austrian National Library in Vienna was formed in  April 2008 by merging the departments of "Manuscripts, Autographs, and Closed Collections" and of "Incunabula, Old and Valuable Books".

Within the library, the manuscripts are given a signature of Cod. plus an abbreviation of the applicable grouping (mostly by language; in the case of the Japanese and Chinese collection, the more generic Cim., for cimelia "heirlooms, treasures" is used). When the context does not make clear that the manuscript is from Vienna, the abbreviation Cod. Vindob. is used, short for Codex Vindobonensis (after  Vindobona, the ancient Roman name of Vienna).

Manuscript groupings
The manuscripts are grouped as follows:
European manuscripts:
Cod. 1-15000   (old holdings)
Cod. Ser. n.1-50178 = Codices Series nova - new acquisitions from about 1870
Armenian manuscripts: Cod. Armen. 1-34 = Codices Armeniaci
Ethiopian manuscripts: Cod. Aethiop. 1-45 = Codices Aethiopici
Chinese manuscripts: Cim. Sin. 1-390 (gaps in the sequence of shelfmarks: Cim. Sin. 1-24, 163, 215, 384-390) = Cimelia Sinica
Georgian manuscripts: Cod. Georg. 1-5 = Codices Georgici
Greek manuscripts:
Cod. Jur. gr. 1-18 = Codices Juridici graeci
Cod. Hist. gr. 1-130 = Codices Historici graeci
Cod. Phil. Gr. 1-347 = Codices Philologici et Philosophici graeci
Cod. Suppl. gr. 1-201 = Codices Supplementum graecum
Cod. Theol. gr. 1-337 = Codices Theologici graeci
Manuscript fragments: Fragm. = Fragmenta
Hebrew manuscripts: Cod. Hebr. 1-244 = Codices Hebraici
Indian manuscripts:
Cod. Ind. 1-171 = Codices Indici
Cod. Sanskr. 1-33 = Codices Sanskritici
Japanese manuscripts: Cim. Jap. 3, 9, 18, 21, 51 = Cimelia Japonica
Coptic manuscripts: Cod. Copt. 1-18 = Codices Coptici
Manuscripts and art albums: Cod. Min. 1-143 = Codices Miniati
Mexican manuscripts: Cod. Mexic. 1-12 = Codices Mexicani
Mongolian manuscripts: Cod. Mongol. 1-2 = Codices Mongolici
Oriental manuscripts:
Cod. A. F. 1-557 = Alter Fond (Old grouping)
Cod. N. F. 1-479 = Neuer Fond (New grouping)
Cod. Mixt. 1-1943 = Codices Mixti (Mixed languages)
Cod. H. O. 1-231 = Codices Historia Osmanica (Ottoman history)
Cod. Gl. 1-250 = Codices of the Glaser collection
Slavic manuscripts: Cod. Slav. 1-236 (229-233 blank) = Codices Slavici
Syrian manuscripts: Cod. Syr. 1-11 = Codices Syriaci

Notable manuscripts
The following is a list of especially notable manuscripts kept in Vienna.

European manuscripts 
 Codex Vindobonensis 387, a Carolingian astronomical compendium
 Codex Vindobonensis 521, a 13th-century manuscript of Adam of Bremen's Gesta
 Codex Vindobonensis 751, 9th-century collections of the letters of Saint Boniface
 Codex Vindobonensis 795, a 9th-century manuscript with letters and treatises of Alcuin
 Cod. Vindob. 1856, the Black Hours of Galeazzo Maria Sforza
 Cod. Vindob. 1857, the Hours of Mary of Burgundy
 Cod. Vindob. 1897, the Hours of James IV of Scotland
 Cod. Vindob. 1908, the Hours of Maria d’Harcourt
 Codex Vindobonensis B 11093, a 15th-century combat treatise

Latin New Testament
 Codex Vindobonensis Lat. 502, 7th-century manuscript of the Gospels
 Codex Vindobonensis Lat. 1235, 6th-century manuscript of the Gospels

Greek manuscripts
Cod. Vindob. med. gr. 1, the Vienna Dioscurides, Constantinople, c. 512.

Codices Philologici et Philosophici graecis 
 Codex Vindobonensis Philos. 2, a  manuscripts of the treatise "On the Soul" of Aristotle
 Codex Vindobonensis Philos. 75, a  manuscripts of the treatise "On the Soul" of Aristotle
 Codex Vindobonensis Philos. 157, a  manuscripts of the treatise "On the Soul" of Aristotle
Codex Vindobonensis phil. Gr. 65 of the 15th cent. This is an
Anonymous Arithmetic and Geometry (Logisticae and Geodaisia)

Codices Theologici graeci
 Vienna Genesis, also known as Codex Vindobonensis Theol. Gr. 31, with two leaves of Codex Petropolitanus Purpureus
 Minuscule 123, also known as Codex Vindobonensis Theol. Gr. 240, a minuscule manuscript of the New Testament, designated by 123 in the  Gregory-Aland numbering
 Minuscule 124, also known as Codex Vindobonensis Theol. Gr. 188, a minuscule manuscript of the New Testament, designated by 124 in the  Gregory-Aland numbering
 Minuscule 125, also known as Codex Vindobonensis Theol. Gr. 50, a minuscule manuscript of the New Testament, designated by 125 in the  Gregory-Aland numbering
 Minuscule 218, also known as Codex Vindobonensis Theol. Gr. 23, a minuscule manuscript of the New Testament, designated by 218 in the Gregory-Aland numbering
 Minuscule 219, also known as Codex Vindobonensis Theol. Gr. 321, a minuscule manuscript of the New Testament, designated by 219 in the  Gregory-Aland numbering
 Minuscule 220, also known as Codex Vindobonensis Theol. Gr. 337, a minuscule manuscript of the New Testament, designated by 220 in the  Gregory-Aland numbering
 Minuscule 404, also known as Codex Vindobonensis Theol. Gr. 313, a minuscule manuscript of the New Testament, designated by 313 in the Gregory-Aland numbering
 Minuscule 421, also known as Codex Vindobonensis Theol. Gr. 210, a minuscule manuscript of the New Testament, designated by 421 in the  Gregory-Aland numbering
 Minuscule 424, also known as Codex Vindobonensis Theol. Gr. 302, a minuscule manuscript of the New Testament, designated by 424 in the  Gregory-Aland numbering
 Minuscule 425, also known as Codex Vindobonensis Theol. Gr. 221, a minuscule manuscript of the New Testament, designated by 425 in the Gregory-Aland numbering
 Minuscule 434, also known as Codex Vindobonensis Theol. Gr. 71, a minuscule manuscript of the New Testament, designated by 434 in the  Gregory-Aland numbering

Codices Juridici graeci
 Lectionary 45, also known as Codex Vindobonensis Jur. gr. 5, a lectionary manuscript of the New Testament, designated by 45 in the  Gregory-Aland numbering, 10th century

Papyri
 Pap. Vindobonensis gr. 2325, known as the Fayyum Fragment, Apocrypha of the New Testament, 3rd century
 Pap. Vindobonensis gr. 17973, manuscript of the New Testament, designated by 𝔓33 in the Gregory-Aland numbering
 Pap. Vindobonensis gr. 39784, manuscript of the New Testament, designated by 𝔓34 in the Gregory-Aland numbering
 Pap. Vindobonensis K. 7377. 7384. 7386. 7426. 7541-7548. 7731. 7912. 7914, manuscript of the New Testament, designated by 𝔓41 in the Gregory-Aland numbering
 Pap. Vindobonensis K. 8706, Greek-Coptic manuscript of the New Testament, designated by 𝔓42 in the Gregory-Aland numbering
 Pap. Vindobonensis G. 31974,  manuscript of the New Testament, designated by 𝔓45 in the Gregory-Aland numbering
 Pap. Vindobonensis gr. 42417, manuscript of the New Testament, designated by 𝔓116 in the Gregory-Aland numbering

Codices Supplementum graecum
 Minuscule 3, also known as Codex Vindobonensis Suppl. gr. 52, a minuscule manuscript of the New Testament, designated by 3 in the Gregory-Aland numbering

Codices Mexicani 
 Codex Vindobonensis Mexicanus I, known also as Codex C, a 14th-century Mesoamerican treatise

See also
 Papyrus Collection of the Austrian National Library

External links
 Österreichische Nationalbibliothek - Department of Manuscripts and Rare Books